Hugo Angeli Bonemer (b. June 25, 1987 ) is an actor, voice actor, presenter and musician from Brazil. He played the leading role of the brazilian version of Broadway’s Hair, the musical also played Ayrton Senna, On his stage biography and was leading role of Rock in Rio - The Musical, in Brazil and in Portugal. He was the winner of 2018‘s "Botequim Cultural" awards for Yank! The Musical and nominated for 2016’s Cesgranrio because of his performance in Ordinary Days and also 2017’s Cesgranrio because of Ayrton Senna, The Musical.

He was in the two seasons of The Secret Life of the Couples, at the single season of Preamar, and third season of O Negócio - All of three HBO Productions. Hugo has taken part in a number of movies including Confissões de Adolescente and Minha Fama de Mau.

Since 2014 Bonemer is the voice talent for Branch on Dreamworks‘ Trolls (in English is Justin Timberlake) and for Freddie Mercury on Bohemian Rhapsody (in English is Rami Malek)

Since 2018 Bonemer is also a TV Host at Canal Like (Claro Video) interviewing moviemakers and suggesting movies and series to the audience.

In March 2018, Bonemer revealed that he was in a relationship with fellow actor Conrado Helt; the two acted together in the musical Yank! and broke up in 2019.

References

 Brazilian actors
1987 births
Brazilian LGBT actors
Living people
People from Maringá